The following is an incomplete list of universities in Afghanistan, sorted by province and in alphabetical order.

Balkh Province

Herat Province

Kabul Province

Kandahar Province

Khost Province

Kunar Province

Kunduz Province

Laghman Province

Logar Province

Nangarhar Province

Other provinces

See also

 Higher education in Afghanistan
 Ministry of Higher Education (Afghanistan)
 List of schools in Afghanistan
 Education in Afghanistan
 List of Pashto-speaking Universities

References
 

Universities
Afghanistan
Afghanistan